Alagna (Lombard: Làgna) is a comune (municipality) in the Province of Pavia in the Italian region Lombardy, located about  southwest of Milan and about  west of Pavia.

Alagna borders the following municipalities: Dorno, Garlasco, Tromello, Valeggio.

Demographic evolution

References 

Cities and towns in Lombardy
Articles which contain graphical timelines